Betrayer of Worlds is  a science fiction novel  by American writers Larry Niven and Edward M. Lerner, set in the Known Space series. It is a sequel to their previous novels Fleet of Worlds, Juggler of Worlds, and Destroyer of Worlds. Set 70 years before Ringworld, it features returning character Nessus, a young Louis Wu, and the rapidly evolving Gw'oth civilization posing a potential threat to the puppeteer Concordance.

References

2010 American novels
Known Space stories
Collaborative novels
Novels by Larry Niven
2010 science fiction novels
American science fiction novels
Tor Books books